Uebeschisee is a small lake at Uebeschi, in the Upper Gürbetal, near Thun, Switzerland. It is located adjacent to the municipalities of Höfen, Amsoldingen and Uebeschi. Rotmoos-Bach drains it into the larger Amsoldingersee.

Lakes of the canton of Bern
Lakes of Switzerland
LUebeschisee